This is a list of the Australian species of the family Blastobasidae. It also acts as an index to the species articles and forms part of the full List of moths of Australia.

These species are usually found in the warmer and wetter parts of Australia. There are no known species from the arid zone. The larvae feed on plant detritus. Larvae have been recorded feeding on old cones of kauri pines and in the old flower spikes and young fruit of palms.

Blastobasis anthoptera Lower, 1907
Blastobasis homadelpha Meyrick, 1902
Blastobasis incuriosa Meyrick, 1916
Blastobasis leucotoxa Meyrick, 1902
Blastobasis adustella Walsingham, 1894
Blastobasis monozona Lower, 1907
Blastobasis nephelias Meyrick, 1902
Blastobasis pallescens Turner, 1947
Blastobasis pentasticta Turner, 1947
Blastobasis phaeopasta Turner, 1947
Blastobasis scotia Turner, 1947
Blastobasis tanyptera Turner, 1947
Blastobasis tarda Meyrick, 1902

External links 
Blastobasidae at Australian Faunal Directory
A Guide to Australian Moths

Australia